David Kenneth Martin (born October 23, 1946) is a former American football linebacker. He played for the Kansas City Chiefs in 1968 and for the Chicago Bears in 1969.

References 

1946 births
Living people
American football linebackers
Notre Dame Fighting Irish football players
Players of American football from Kansas
Kansas City Chiefs players
Chicago Bears players